Hayk Hakobyan (born 26 December 1980) is an Armenian football player. He has played for Armenia national team.

National team statistics

References

1980 births
Living people
Armenian footballers
Armenia international footballers
Armenian Premier League players

Association football forwards